Aspendale is a historic house and plantation property on Delaware Route 300 west of Kenton, Kent County, Delaware, United States.  The main house, built 1771–73, has been under a single family's ownership since construction and is a rare, well-preserved example of a Georgian "Quaker plan" house. It was listed on the National Register of Historic Places and declared a National Historic Landmark in 1970.

Description and history
The main house is set near the road, surrounded by landscaping. It is a modest -story brick structure with a gabled roof and end chimneys joined by curtain walls. A single-story gable-roofed wood-frame addition extends to one side. The front and rear of the main block consist of brick laid in a Flemish bond, while the ends are laid in a common bond. The main facade is three bays wide, with a symmetrical arrangement of sash windows around a center entrance. In a traditional Delaware pattern, the ground-floor windows have paneled shutters, while the upper-level windows have louvered shutters. The interior has a rare example of a "Quaker plan", with a sizeable front-to-back parlor on the east side and a study and living room separated by a hall on the west side. These rooms all exhibit original woodwork and other features.

The land on which the house stands was deeded in 1770 to Charles Numbers and was (as of its landmark designation in 1970) still in the hands of Numbers' descendants. The house was built between 1771 and 1773. The large parlor was subdivided with partitions in the 19th century, and a Victorian porch was added; both elements were reversed during a restoration of the property in the 1960s.

See also
List of National Historic Landmarks in Delaware
National Register of Historic Places listings in Kent County, Delaware

References

External links

 

Historic American Buildings Survey in Delaware
National Historic Landmarks in Delaware
Houses on the National Register of Historic Places in Delaware
Houses in Kent County, Delaware
Kenton, Delaware
Georgian architecture in Delaware
Houses completed in 1773
National Register of Historic Places in Kent County, Delaware
Plantation houses in Delaware